On 12 August 1893 a T-link broke beneath a locomotive running down the bank from Merthyr to Cardiff hauling a passenger train. This allowed an underhung spring to break away from the engine and foul the wheels of the leading van, derailing the entire train. The first six carriages ran down an embankment, killing thirteen.

Sources

Derailments in Wales
Railway accidents in 1893
1893 disasters in the United Kingdom
Rail transport in Rhondda Cynon Taf
History of Glamorgan
Accidents and incidents involving Taff Vale Railway
Llantrisant
1893 in Wales
August 1893 events
19th century in Glamorgan